Kahi (born Park Ji-young, 1980) is a South Korean singer, dancer and actress. 

Kahi may also refer to:

Places
Kahi, Iran
Kahi, Hangu district, Pakistan
Kahi, Nowshera district, Pakistan
Kahi railway station, Khyber Pakhtunkhwa, Pakistan

Other uses
KAHI, a radio station licensed to Auburn, California, U.S.
Kahi Lee, an American interior designer and TV host

See also